La Razón (Spanish: "Reason") is used as a name for newspapers in the Spanish-speaking world including:

La Razón (Buenos Aires), Argentina
La Razón (La Paz), Bolivia
La Razón (Guayaquil), Ecuador
La Razón (Lima), Perú
La Razón (Madrid), Spain
La Razón (Monterrey), Mexico
La Razón (Florida), United States
La Razón (Montevideo), Uruguay
La Razón (Caracas), Venezuela